Collaborative Research Centres (CRC) or Sonderforschungsbereiche (SFB) are long-term basic research projects paid by the Deutsche Forschungsgemeinschaft (DFG). They can be extended to up to 12 years. In the CRC, scientists from several disciplines of a university or several universities work together. CRCs enable institutions to further develop their research profile und build structures. The universities can also cooperate with non-university research institutions.

See also 
 Science and technology in Germany

References

Science and technology in Germany
Year of establishment missing